Souderton is a borough in Montgomery County, Pennsylvania, United States. The population was 7,191 at the 2020 census.

Souderton formerly hosted the end of the annual Bucks County Classic, a professional bicycle race.

History
The town was originally named Welshtown, because it was settled by the Welsh.  Souderton is prefigured in a map of 1847 as Souder's Lumberyard, and the new name was certainly in place by the railroad era in the second half of the 19th century. The name comes from town resident Henry O. Souder and his store near the railroad.

The Souderton Historic District was listed on the National Register of Historic Places in 2011.

Geography 
Souderton is located at  (40.310215, -75.321682).

According to the United States Census Bureau, the borough has a total area of 1.1 square miles (2.9 km2), all land. The terrain consists of gently rolling hills, with some steeper hills in the downtown area, and flat terrain throughout.

Neighboring municipalities
Souderton is bordered by:
 Franconia Township on the east, southeast and south
 Telford borough on the northwest
 Hilltown Township in Bucks County across County Line Road on the northeast

Some adjacent areas in Hilltown Township, Bucks County, including Calvary Church, have a Souderton postal address.

Climate
Souderton has a hot-summer humid continental climate (Dfa) and average monthly temperatures range from 29.5 °F in January to 74.1 °F in July.  The local hardiness zone is 6b.

Politics and government
Souderton has a city manager form of government with a mayor and a nine-member borough council. Souderton's current borough councilors are: 
Matthew J. DiNenna-Ward 1 
Richard M. Walczak-Ward 1 
Matthew Sholly-Ward 1 
Tracy W. Burke-Ward 2 - President 
Julie Munden-Ward 2 - President Pro-Tem 
Daryl Littlefield-Ward 2
Edward Huber-Ward 3 - Vice-President 	
Donna Rogers-Ward 3
Courtnee L. Wampole-Ward 3

The Mayor is Jake Paul (D). Souderton also has two appointed Junior Councilors, who are appointed when under 18 years of age and serve a one-year term, without voting privileges. The current Junior Councilors are Estrela Sadiboko  and Elijah Steglik.  The Borough Manager is P. Michael Coll.

The borough is represented by the following officials:
 Brian Fitzpatrick (R), Pennsylvania's 1st congressional district
 Steve Malagari (D), Pennsylvania's 53rd Representative District
 Maria Collett (D), Pennsylvania's 12th Senatorial District
 Bob Casey Jr. (D), United States Senator from Pennsylvania
 John Fetterman (D), United States Senator from Pennsylvania

Arts
Souderton is home to Montgomery Theater, one of only three professional theaters in Montgomery County. Sitting in the historic firehouse on Main Street (Rte 113), the Theater produces five subscription-series shows each year, and offers education programs for students ages 8–18. Montgomery Theater draws people to Souderton from around the five-county area. 
Souderton also hosts an annual Art Jam every September, bringing artists and artisans to the borough park, and offering craft beer and wine tastings. This event is hosted by Souderton-Telford Main Streets, the non-profit organization that supports revitalization in Souderton.

Sports

Souderton was host to the Univest Grand Prix, a one-day road bicycle racing event that is part of the USA Cycling Professional Tour. It took place in early September and publicized its association with Floyd Landis. This event was part of a weekend of longer bike races in surrounding towns.  Participants were from varying areas in the United States, and foreign countries, mainly European. Italian, French and Flemish teams often returned to the race annually. Although the race went professional, there were amateur races earlier in the morning for youths and adults. In 2012, the race was officially discontinued in the Souderton Borough.

Souderton is also known for its strong involvement in the baseball community, having two former players  Jamie Moyer, and Erik Kratz make the MLB. The American Legion baseball team in Souderton is nationally ranked, with a 2018 rank of #18 in the country. They placed second in the state in 2018 under coach Meara. Their rival is Doylestown in nearby Bucks County.

Demographics

As of the 2010 census, the borough was 85.6% White, 2.5% Black or African American, 0.3% Native American, 4.7% Asian, and 2.6% were two or more races; 11.5% of the population was of Hispanic or Latino ancestry.

As of the census of 2000,  6,730 people, 2,635 households, and 1,765 families resided in the borough.  The population density was 6,015.7 people per square mile (2,320.1/km2).  The 2,720 housing units averaged 2,431.3 per square mile (937.7/km2).  The racial makeup of the borough was 91.69% White, 1.00% African American, 0.19% Native American, 3.98% Asian, 0.03% Pacific Islander, 1.86% from other races, and 1.25% from two or more races. Hispanics or Latinos of any race were 4.29% of the population.

Of the 2,635 households, 32.5% had children under the age of 18 living with them, 55.1% were married couples living together, 8.3% had a female householder with no husband present, and 33.0% were not families. About 26.4% of all households were made up of individuals, and 10.0% had someone living alone who was 65 years of age or older.  The average household size was 2.54 and the average family size was 3.12.

In the borough, the population was distributed as 25.1% under the age of 18, 9.0% from 18 to 24, 34.0% from 25 to 44, 19.3% from 45 to 64, and 12.7% who were 65 years of age or older.  The median age was 35 years. For every 100 females, there were 97.5 males.  For every 100 females age 18 and over, there were 94.9 males.

The median income for a household in the borough was $47,437, and for a family was $57,200. Males had a median income of $36,280 versus $28,580 for females. The per capita income for the borough was $21,758.  About 3.2% of families and 4.4% of the population were below the poverty line, including 3.2% of those under age 18 and 7.1% of those age 65 or over.

Notable people
 Henry Gerhard Appenzeller, a Methodist missionary who brought Protestant Christianity to Korea in 1884, was born in Souderton.
 Robert Godshall, Pennsylvania state representative, was born in Souderton.
 Steven Grasse, artist
 Donald Haldeman, the 1976 Olympic Gold Medalist in trap shooting, is from Souderton.
 Donald Hunsberger, former conductor of the Eastman Wind Ensemble and recorder for Wynton Marsalis, is from Souderton.
 Erik Kratz, Major League Baseball catcher
 Jamie Moyer, Philadelphia Phillies pitcher, was born in Sellersville, Pennsylvania, and grew up in Souderton.
 God Lives Underwater guitar player Jeff Turzo graduated from Souderton Area Senior High School in 1989.
 Bloodhound Gang bass player Jared Hasselhoff graduated from Souderton Area Senior High School in 1989.

Infrastructure

Transportation

Highways and roads

Pennsylvania Route 113 passes through Souderton along Main Street and Broad Street, heading southwest to Harleysville and northeast to Silverdale. PA 113 has an interchange with the Pennsylvania Route 309 freeway to the northeast of Souderton; PA 309 heads north to Quakertown and south to Montgomeryville.

Railroads past and present

A rail line dating from the early 1900s (the Reading Company's former Bethlehem Branch) runs through Souderton connecting to Telford, Perkasie, Quakertown, and Bethlehem to the north and Hatfield and Lansdale to the south. This line was taken over for passenger operation from the Reading until 1981. Still active for freight, the Pennsylvania Northeastern Railroad operates through Souderton on these former SEPTA tracks. Every August, Pennsylvania Northeastern Railroad partners with New Hope and Ivyland Railroad to provide excursions to Souderton Station. Trains only use the station as a turnaround point and do not use its platform for passengers.

Interurban trolley
From 1901 until 1951, an interurban electric trolley, the Lehigh Valley Transit, operated hourly service from Souderton north to Allentown and south to Philadelphia. Its Souderton station was at the northwest corner of Broad and Main streets opposite the steam railroad Reading's Souderton station. The LVT ran north in the middle of Main Street, turned onto Summit Street and crossed the Reading on the Summit Street bridge, then angled toward Telford, its next stop.  LVT had a large maintenance facility with car storage tracks reached by a track that branched from Summit Street. That building was turned into a local supermarket before it burned down in the 1990s. The LVT carried heavy passenger loads during World War 2 when gas rationing reduced automobile use, but when the war ended, passenger count collapsed and the line abandoned and began running buses.

Bus
SEPTA Suburban Bus Route 132 serves Souderton, heading north to Telford and south to Hatfield, Lansdale, and the Montgomery Mall in Montgomeryville.

Utilities
PPL Corporation in Allentown provides electricity to Souderton. Natural gas in Souderton is provided by PECO Energy Company, a subsidiary of Exelon. The North Penn Water Authority provides water to Souderton and surrounding areas in the North Penn Valley. The borough's Sewer Department provides sewer service to Souderton. Trash and recycling collection in Souderton is provided under contract by J.P. Mascaro & Sons.

See also

Impact of the 2019–20 coronavirus pandemic on the meat industry in the United States

References

External links

Borough of Souderton
Souderton-Telford Main Streets
Souderton Independent newspaper

Populated places established in 1888
Boroughs in Montgomery County, Pennsylvania
1887 establishments in Pennsylvania